Andrew Buteera (born 3 October 1994) is a Rwandan footballer who plays as a midfielder for APR and the Rwanda national football team.

Club career
Born in Kampala, Buteera started his career at Proline in Uganda in 2011 before joining APR on a two-year deal in 2012.

International career
Buteera made his international debut for Rwanda on 3 September 2011 in a 5–0 2012 Africa Cup of Nations qualification defeat to Ivory Coast.

References

Living people
1994 births
Rwandan footballers
Sportspeople from Kampala
Association football midfielders
Proline FC players
APR F.C. players
Rwanda international footballers

External links